The Friends is a play by Arnold Wesker, written in 1970. It was produced by the Stratford Festival in 1970.

References 
 J. Alan B. Somerset. (1991). The Stratford Festival Story, 1st edition.  Greenwood Press.  

1970 plays
Plays by Arnold Wesker